Muhamad Fadhilah bin Mohd Pauzi (born 23 April 1996) is a Malaysian professional footballer who plays as a defensive midfielder.

Fadhilah began his career with Kelantan youth team in 2014 at age of 18. In August 2016, Fadhilah has been promoted to the Kelantan first team after his good performance with the youth team. He made 1 appearance in 2016 Malaysia Cup as a substitute.

Club career

Kelantan
Fadhilah featured in Kelantan's first team for 2017 season. He made his league debut against T–Team after coming from the bench at 75th which the team lost by 3–1 on 11 July 2017. On 22 July 2017, Fadhilah made his debut first starts for Kelantan in a 1–0 defeat to Selangor in MP Selayang Stadium.

Fadhilah made his 2018 league season debut in 2–1 defeat to Melaka United on 3 February 2018.

Career statistics

Club

Honours

Club
Kelantan U19
Malaysia Youth League: 2014

Kelantan U21
Malaysia President Cup: 2016

References

External links
 

Living people
1996 births
People from Kelantan
Malaysian people of Malay descent
Malaysian footballers
Kelantan FA players
Association football defenders
Malaysia Super League players